Cuyahoga Community College (Tri-C) is a public community college in Cuyahoga County, Ohio. Founded in 1963, it is the oldest and largest public community college within the state.

Tri-C schedules on the semester basis, and offers over 1,000 courses in associate degree programs through traditional classroom settings as well as distance learning services and its flagship offering known as Cable College. Cable College has offered classes live through the Cleveland area cable companies since the early 1990s. The institution promotes academic advancement through transfer articulation agreements with four-year colleges and universities. Tri-C is accredited by the Higher Learning Commission.

Locations

Cuyahoga Community College operates a multi-campus college district in Northeast Ohio. With Cuyahoga County as its primary service area, Tri-C serves Cleveland and the surrounding communities.

The campuses include the Eastern Campus in Highland Hills, the Metropolitan Campus of Downtown Cleveland's Campus District, Western Campus in Parma and Parma Heights, the Brunswick Campus in Brunswick, and the Westshore campus in Westlake.  Tri-C houses its district administrative services at a separate location in Cleveland.

The college also operates two Corporate College business training facilities: Corporate College East in Warrensville Heights and Corporate College West in Westlake.

Other locations in downtown Cleveland include the Tri-C's Workforce and Economic Development Division (based in the Unified Technologies Center) and the Hospitality Management Center at Public Square.

The Rock and Roll Hall of Fame's Library and Archives are located at the Metropolitan Campus' Gill and Tommy LiPuma Center for Creative Arts.

Athletics and student life
Cuyahoga Community College has the following sports activities. 
Men's Baseball
Men's Basketball
Women's Basketball
Women's Cross Country & Track
Women's Softball
Women's Volleyball
Men's Soccer
The college also has a variety of activities ranging from involvement in the campus governance systems to fine arts and entertainment programming, and membership in student organizations and clubs.

Cuyahoga Community College has won the following NJCAA national titles:
Men's Wrestling: 1976
Men's Basketball: 2004 (Division II)

Arts
Since 1980 Cuyahoga Community College has hosted the Tri-C JazzFest.

Presidents
Charles Chapman (1962-1973)
Nolen Ellison (1974-1991)
Jerry Sue Thornton (1992-2013)
Alex Johnson (2013-2022) 
Michael A. Baston (2022-Present)

Notable alumni
 Halle Berry, Academy Award Winning actress
Shontel Brown, U.S. Congresswoman
 Jerome Caja, Performance artist
 Darrin Chapin, Major League Baseball player
 Wayne Dawson, News Broadcaster
 Frank G. Jackson, Mayor of Cleveland 
 Dominique Moceanu, 1996 Olympic Gold Medalist
 Dale Mohorcic, Major League Baseball player
 Lorin Morgan-Richards, Author and illustrator
 Jeff Shaw, Major League Baseball player
 Ben Wallace, Detroit Pistons, NBA

See also
List of community colleges

References

External links
 

 
Educational institutions established in 1963
Community colleges in Ohio
Universities and colleges in Cleveland
Universities and colleges in Cuyahoga County, Ohio
1963 establishments in Ohio
NJCAA athletics